Sulton Rogers (1922 – April 5, 2003) was a Mississippi folk artist who spent most of his life in Syracuse, New York working at a chemical plant. He moved back to Oxford, Mississippi in 1995 and lived there until he died.

Rogers referred to his carvings as "haints" and primarily carved humans with oversized features. The oversized features included multiple eyes, animals coming out of body parts, and extra breasts. He would also carve multiple related carvings known as "haint houses". These pieces sometimes included dollhouses that would be filled with the human carvings. While he normally carved people, he would also carve animals.

 – Sulton Rogers, 1991 (Artist's Alliance- It'll Come True).

His pieces are the part of permanent collections at the University of Mississippi Museum of Art, the African American Museum, and the Paul and Lulu Hilliard University Art Museum. His carvings have also appeared in the Dallas Museum of Art, New Orleans Museum of Art, and the American Visionary Art Museum. Collectors should be aware that auction houses and some publications misspell his name as "Sultan Rodgers".

Family life 
Rogers was married in 1941 at age 19 and had a son named Van. He later married Ardeula in 1945 and they conceived seven children together, RV, Allie B., Willie Sulton, Eddie, Sammie, Lossie, and Loretta. He also fathered Bobby, Roy, Jackie, Katie, and Jimmy. Although he left his family in Mississippi to seek employment in New York, he reunited with his family many years before his death.

References 

 Delahanty, Randolph, Art in the American South
 Artist's Alliance, It'll Come True

External links 
 Mississippi Museum of Art
 American Visionary Art Museum
 University Art Museum
 Dallas Museum of Art
 New Orleans Museum of Art
 African American Museum
 Folk Art
 Gordon Gallery
 Rising Fawn Folk Art

Folk artists
1922 births
2003 deaths